Chrysocraspeda mitigata is a species of moth in the family Geometridae first described by Francis Walker in 1861. It is found in India, Myanmar and Borneo.

References

Sterrhinae
Moths described in 1861
Moths of Borneo